Commercial code might refer to:

Commercial code (law), a set of laws designed to regulate commerce
Commercial code (communications), a code used in telegraph and telex messages